Miramón is a Spanish and French surname. Notable people with the surname include:
Ignacio Miramón (born 2003), Argentine footballer
Jorge Miramón (born 1989), Spanish footballer
José Manuel Aguirre Miramón (1813–1887), Spanish jurist, politician and writer
Miguel Miramón (1831–1867), former president of Mexico and general of the Reform War

French-language surnames
Spanish-language surnames